The following lists the events of the 1899 Philadelphia Phillies season.

Preseason 
The Phillies held spring training in 1899 in Charlotte, North Carolina where the team practiced and played exhibition games at the Latta Park Baseball Field. The team boarded and made its headquarters at the Central Hotel. On Easter Sunday, April 2, the team attended services at St. Peter's Catholic Church. It was the first season the Phillies trained in Charlotte and the team's first at the Latta Park Baseball Field.

Regular season

Season standings

Record vs. opponents

Roster

Player stats

Batting

Starters by position 
Note: Pos = Position; G = Games played; AB = At bats; H = Hits; Avg. = Batting average; HR = Home runs; RBI = Runs batted in

Other batters 
Note: G = Games played; AB = At bats; H = Hits; Avg. = Batting average; HR = Home runs; RBI = Runs batted in

Pitching

Starting pitchers 
Note: G = Games pitched; IP = Innings pitched; W = Wins; L = Losses; ERA = Earned run average; SO = Strikeouts

Other pitchers 
Note: G = Games pitched; IP = Innings pitched; W = Wins; L = Losses; ERA = Earned run average; SO = Strikeouts

Notes

References 
1899 Philadelphia Phillies season at Baseball Reference

Philadelphia Phillies seasons
Philadelphia Phillies season
Philly